Jeena Marna Tere Sang is a 1992 Indian Hindi-language romantic action film directed by Vijay Reddy. It stars Sanjay Dutt and Raveena Tandon. The movie is a remake of 1983 Kannada film Prema Parva starring Murali and Bhavya.

Cast

 Sanjay Dutt as Amar Khurana
 Raveena Tandon as Ashna (Asha)
 Javed Jaffrey as Vijay, Amar's College Friend 
 Sadashiv Amrapurkar as MLA Dayanand Khurana, Amar's Father
Reema Lagoo as Dr. Lakshmi Khurana, Amar's Mother (guest appearance)
 Paresh Rawal as Minister Hiralal
 Alok Nath as Asha's Father
 Aruna Irani as Kamla, Asha's Stepmother
 Annu Kapoor as Pinto, Amar's college friend 
 Asrani as Traffic Police Constable (guest appearance)
 Viju Khote as P.A. of College Principal 
 Tej Sapru as Gulati, nephew of Kamla
 Tiku Talsania as Professor Chephutkar
 Guddi Maruti as Asha's college friend (guest appearance)
 Satyen Kappu as Servant of Dayanand Khurana
 Chandrashekhar as college principal 
 Sonika Gill as Priya, Hiralal's daughter
 Aparajita Bhushan as Professor Shyamala

Soundtrack

External links

1990s Hindi-language films
1992 films
Films scored by Dilip Sen-Sameer Sen
Hindi remakes of Kannada films
T-Series (company) films
Films scored by Babul Bose